Qin Shi Huang is a Chinese television series based on the life of Qin Shi Huang, the First Emperor who unified China under the Qin dynasty in 221 BC. The series was filmed between 1999 and 2000 and was first released in 2001 in Hong Kong and Thailand and in 2002 in Singapore. In China, the series was edited and altered by historians and experts before it was approved for broadcast on CCTV-1 in 2007.

Cast

 Zhang Fengyi as Qin Shi Huang
 Wang Heyu as Qin Shi Huang (child)
 Gao Ming as Lü Buwei
 Song Jia as Lady Zhao (Queen Dowager Zhao)
 Liu Wei as Li Si
 Zhao Liang as Zhao Gao
 Song Chunli as Lady Huayang
 Fan Bingbing as Princess A'ruo of Chu
 Zhang Jingchu as Princess Mindai of Zhao
 Xu Huanhuan as Li Jiang
 Ma Shuliang as Lord Changping
 Guo Fazeng as Lord Shang
 Zhou Xiaopeng as Chengjiao
 Tan Tao as Fusu
 Yizhen as Lao Ai
 Chuo Eryong as King Zhuangxiang of Qin
 Deng Tao as Lady Chu
 Li Xinling as A'ran
 Kou Zhenhai as Jing Ke
 He Lin as Lady Meng Jiang
 Yang Ruoxi as A'jin
 Wang Maolei as Huhai
 Zhang Heng as Lüniang
 Zhang Zhitong as Queen Dowager Xia
 Wu Yue as crown prince of Zhao
 Gao Liang as Wei Liao

International Broadcast

See also
 Rise of the Great Wall
 The Emperor's Shadow
 The Emperor and the Assassin
 Hero (2002 film)

External links
  Qin Shi Huang on Sina.com
  Qin Shi Huang on sqrb.com
  Qin Shi Huang official page on CCTV's website

2001 Chinese television series debuts
Television series set in the Qin dynasty
Mandarin-language television shows
Chinese historical television series
Cultural depictions of Qin Shi Huang
Television shows set in Xi'an